John Allen Monroe (August 24, 1897 – June 19, 1956) was an infielder in Major League Baseball for the New York Giants and Philadelphia Phillies in 1921.

References

External links

1897 births
1956 deaths
Major League Baseball second basemen
New York Giants (NL) players
Philadelphia Phillies players
Baseball players from Texas
Beaumont Exporters players
Houston Buffaloes players
Omaha Buffaloes players
Sacramento Senators players
Mission Reds players
Portland Beavers players
Kansas City Blues (baseball) players
Little Rock Travelers players